Prenolepis ceylonica is a species of ant in the subfamily Myrmicinae found in the Philippines, India, Bangladesh, Sri Lanka, and China.

References

External links

 at antwiki.org
Itis.gov
Animaldiversity.org

Formicinae
Hymenoptera of Asia
Insects described in 1901